Patricia Lawrence (19 November 1925, Andover, Hampshire – 7 March 1993, Chelsea, London) was a British actress.

Personal life

In 1947 she married writer and arts administrator Greville Poke (1912–2000) in the City of Westminster. Lawrence and Poke had two sons, Christopher Frederick Lawrence Poke and musician James John Lawrence Poke. She died in 1993, aged 67 years, in Chelsea.

Career

She was well known for playing the formidable Sister Ulrica, a Dutch prisoner of war in the BBC television series drama Tenko and Ellie Herries in the BBC television drama To Serve Them All My Days (TV series).

Filmography

References

External links
 

1925 births
1993 deaths
20th-century English actresses
English film actresses
English television actresses
People from Andover, Hampshire
People from Chelsea, London